Jumabek İbraimoviç Ibraimov (Жумабек Ибраимович Ибраимов) (1 January 1944 – 4 April 1999) was a Kyrgyz politician. He served as prime minister and Mayor of Bishkek from 1993 1995. He was born in Dzhany-Alysh of Kemin District he graduated from Frunze Polytechnic Institute in 1971. He was a post-graduate student and worked as a teacher until mid-70s. In 1976 - 1977 he worked as an engineer and the head of the department of technology at the Agricultural Machinery Works named after M.V.Frunze, and in 1977 - 1984 as a design engineer, head of engineering department, chief engineer, and director of Min-Kush branch of Orgtehnika factory. In 1984 he became a head of People's Control Commission, and the First Secretary of Balykchy Town Committee of Communist Party. In 1988 - 1991, Jumabek Ibraimov served as a First Deputy of a Head of Administration of Central Committee of Communist Party of Kyrgyzstan. He served as the Mayor of Bishkek from 1993 to 1995. President of Kyrgyzstan Askar Akayev appointed him Prime Minister on 25 December 1998 after Akayev dissolved the Cabinet. Ibraimov served until he died of stomach cancer on 4 April 1999.

References

1944 births
1999 deaths
Ibraimov, Zhumabek
Ibraimov, Zhumabek
Deaths from stomach cancer
Kyrgyz Technical University alumni